Bankoa is a traditional Spanish bank founded in 1975 and located in San Sebastián.

The original name was the Banco Industrial de Guipúzcoa and worked as an industrial bank. In 1997, it was acquired by the Crédit Agricole, the name was changed to Bankoa, and it became a universal bank.

On November 14, 2021, ABANCA completed the integration of Bankoa with the completion of the last two operations of the process: the brand implementation and the transfer of the activity to ABANCA's technological and operational platform. ABANCA will operate in the Basque Country, Navarra and La Rioja under the brand name "Bankoa ABANCA".

References

External links 
Homepage

Banks of Spain
Crédit Agricole subsidiaries
Banks established in 1975
1975 establishments in Spain